Elba Rosa Pérez Montoya (born November 20, 1960) is a Cuban politician of the Communist Party of Cuba. In 2012 she became Cuba's Minister of Science, Technology and the Environment.

Life
Pérez Montoya was born in 1960.

She is a scientist with a Masters degree. She became the Leading Professor and the Head of the Universidad de Oriente'a Department of Social and Humanistic Science.

Pérez Montoya is a member of the Communist Party of Cuba and she is one of the representatives for Granma Province. She became the Minister of Science, Technology and the Environment in 2012.

In 2018 she was re-elected as a Deputy to Cuba's National Assembly of People's Power at Havana's Convention Center.

In 2019 the Cuban Prime Minister, Manuel Marrero Cruz, ratified Minister Pérez Montoya as a member of his council of ministers.

In 2022 for World Environment Day, Cuba's plans to be come more sustainable will be reviewed. Perez Montoya will present her country's progress at the +50 conference on 2 and 3 June in Sweden.

References

1960 births
Living people
Communist Party of Cuba politicians
Government ministers of Cuba